Pielgrzymowice  is a village in the administrative district of Gmina Pawłowice, within Pszczyna County, Silesian Voivodeship, in southern Poland.

The village has a population of 2,395.

The village was first mentioned in a Latin document of Diocese of Wrocław called Liber fundationis episcopatus Vratislaviensis from around 1305 as item in Peregrini villa debent esse XXIII) mansi. The creation of the village was a part of a larger settlement campaign taking place in the late 13th century on the territory of what will be later known as Upper Silesia.

Notable people 
Karol Miarka (1825-1891), Polish social and national activist

References

Villages in Pszczyna County